Dziarnowo may refer to the following places in Poland:

 Dziarnowo, Masovian Voivodeship
 Dziarnowo, Kuyavian-Pomeranian Voivodeship